Belgium competed at the 1984 Summer Olympics in Los Angeles. 63 competitors, 47 men and 16 women, took part in 48 events in 14 sports.

Medalists

Archery

Women competed for the first time in Belgium's fourth appearance in the modern archery competition.  Marnix Vervinck was only the second Belgian to place in the top eight, and the first since 1972.

Women's Individual Competition:
 Marie Claire van Stevens — 2431 points (→ 22nd place)
 Raymonda Verlinden — 2288 points (→ 40th place)

Men's Individual Competition:
 Marnix Vervinck — 2519 points (→ 7th place)
 Patrick DeKoning — 2486 (→ 14th place)
 Willy van den Bossche — 2454 points (→ 26th place)

Athletics

Men's 5,000 metres
Bob Verbeeck
 Heat — 13:46.27
 Semifinals — 13:46.03 (→ did not advance)
Vincent Rousseau
 Heat — 13:57.96 (→ did not advance)

Men's Marathon
 Karel Lismont — 2:17:07 (→ 24th place)
 Armand Parmentier — 2:18:10 (→ 30th place)
 Johan Geirnaert — 2:21:35 (→ 41st place)

Men's High Jump
 Eddy Annys
 Qualification — 2.21m (→ did not advance)

Men's Long Jump
 Ronald Desruelles
 Qualification — did not start (→ did not advance, no ranking)

Women's Marathon 
 Ria Van Landeghem
 Final — 2:37:11 (→ 21st place)
 Marie-Christine Deurbroeck
 Final — 2:38:01 (→ 24th place)
 Francine Peeters
 Final — 2:42:22 (→ 29th place)

Women's High Jump 
Christine Soetewey
 Qualification — 1.80m (→ did not advance, 22nd place)

Canoeing

Cycling

Eight cyclists represented Belgium in 1984.

Individual road race
 Carlo Bomans
 Ronny Van Sweevelt
 Frank Verleyen

Sprint
 Frank Orban

Individual pursuit
 Rudi Ceyssens

Team pursuit
 Rudi Ceyssens
 Roger Ilegems
 Peter Roes
 Joseph Smeets

Points race
 Roger Ilegems
 Final — 37 points (→  Gold Medal)
 Rudi Ceyssens
 Final — 16 points (→ 11th place)

Diving

Men's 3m Springboard
Tom Lemaire
 Preliminary Round — 515.16 points (→ did not advance, 16th place)

Equestrianism

Fencing

Four fencers, all men, represented Belgium in 1984.

Men's foil
 Thierry Soumagne
 Peter Joos
 Stefan Joos

Men's team foil
 Thierry Soumagne, Peter Joos, Stefan Joos, Stéphane Ganeff

Men's épée
 Stéphane Ganeff
 Thierry Soumagne
 Stefan Joos

Judo

Rhythmic gymnastics

Rowing

Sailing

Shooting

Swimming

Men's 400m Freestyle
Marc Van De Weghe
 Heat — 4:00.01 (→ did not advance, 20th place)

Men's 1500m Freestyle 
Marc Van De Weghe
 Heat — 15:45.50 (→ did not advance, 19th place)

Women's 100m Backstroke
Sabine Pauwels
 Heat — 1:05.17
 B-Final — 1:05.33 (→ 15th place)
Yolande Van Der Straeten
 Heat — 1:07.07 (→ did not advance, 22nd place)

Women's 200m Backstroke
Yolande Van Der Straeten
 Heat — 2:18.49
 B-Final — 2:18.63 (→ 13th place)
Sabine Pauwels
 Heat — 2:21.36 (→ did not advance, 18th place)

Women's 200m Individual Medley
Sabine Pauwels
 Heat — 2:22.86 (→ did not advance, 17th place)

Synchronized swimming

References

Nations at the 1984 Summer Olympics
1984
Olympics